Deuterocopus papuaensis is a moth of the family Pterophoridae. It is found in New Guinea.

External links
Papua Insects

Deuterocopinae